The 1976 Volunteer 400 was a NASCAR Winston Cup Series race that took place on August 29, 1976, at Bristol International Speedway in Bristol, Tennessee.

The five drivers that dominated the 1976 NASCAR Winston Cup Series season were David Pearson (average finish of 7th place), Cale Yarborough (average finish of 8th place), Richard Petty (average finish of 9th place), Benny Parsons (average finish of 10th place), and Bobby Allison (average finish 12th place).

Race report
This race took two hours and eighteen minutes to complete in front of twelve thousand fans. Two cautions slowed the race for thirteen laps. Cale Yarborough defeated Richard Petty by more than two laps. Other notable drivers included Darrell Waltrip, Benny Parsons, Richard Childress, J.D. McDuffie, and Elmo Langley.

Joe Frasson ran out of tires on lap 5 while Ed Negre would lose the rear end of his vehicle on lap 12. Dean Dalton's transmission would stop working on lap 15. Gary Myers would blow his engine on lap 35 while Walter Ballard would do the identical thing on lap 55. Elmo Langley would ruin his vehicle's engine on lap 106. Clyde Lynn would wreck the transmission of his car on lap 123. J.D. McDuffie's engine only could make it to lap 154 while Dave Marcis' engine lasted until 248. Cecil Gordon's engine would last until lap 270; when he had to leave the race. Frank Warren was the lowest finishing driver to complete the entire race without any mechanical problems.

Clyde Lynn would retire after this event.

The points leader after this event would be Cale Yarborough. He would go on to become the NASCAR Cup Series champion at the end of the season.

The drivers competed for the purse which was $61,105 ($ when adjusted for inflation). Yarborough earned the largest share with $10,025 ($ when adjusted for inflation) while last-place finisher Joe Frasson walked away with $400 ($ when adjusted for inflation).

Qualifying

Finishing order
Section reference: 

 Cale Yarborough (No. 11)
 Richard Petty (No. 43)
 Darrell Waltrip (No. 88)
 Benny Parsons† (No. 72)
 Buddy Baker† (No. 15)
 Bobby Allison (No. 2)
 Dick Brooks† (No. 90)
 Lennie Pond (No. 54)
 Bobby Wawak† (No. 36)
 Richard Childress (No. 3)
 D.K. Ulrich (No. 40)
 Terry Bivins (No. 30)
 James Hylton† (No. 48)
 David Sisco (No. 05)
 Henley Gray (No. 19)
 Dick May† (No. 25)
 Buddy Arrington (No. 67)
 Skip Manning (No. 92)
 Jimmy Means (No. 52)
 Frank Warren (No. 79)
 Cecil Gordon*† (No. 24)
 Dave Marcis* (No. 71)
 J.D. McDuffie*† (No. 70)
 Clyde Lynn*† (No. 10)
 Elmo Langley*† (No. 64)
 Walter Ballard* (No. 45)
 Gary Myers* (No. 04)
 Dean Dalton* (No. 7)
 Ed Negre* (No. 8)
 Joe Frasson*† (No. 18)

† signifies that the driver is known to be deceased 
* Driver failed to finish race

Standings after the race

References

Volunteer 600
Volunteer 600
NASCAR races at Bristol Motor Speedway